, was a politician and cabinet minister in the Empire of Japan, serving as a member of the House of Peers of the Diet of Japan, twice as a cabinet minister, and also serving twice as mayor of Tokyo.

Biography 
Nagata was born in Mihara District, Hyōgo Prefecture, in what is now part of the city of Minamiawaji. After graduating from the predecessor of Kyoto Imperial University and serving as a school principal in Sumoto, Hyōgo from 1902 to 1904, he obtained a posting in the Home Ministry and rose to become head of the Kyoto Prefectural Police Department. From April to October 1916, Nagata was appointed governor of Mie Prefecture, returning afterwards to the Home Ministry to head the Public Security Bureau. From December 22, 1920, to May 29, 1923, he served as Deputy Mayor of Tokyo.

From May 29, 1923, to September 8, 1924, Nagata was appointed mayor of Tokyo, and was thus in office during the 1923 Great Kantō earthquake of September 1, which destroyed most of the city.  In 1926, he published a book titled Return to the Spirit of the Founding of the Japanese State, to help promote the new national holiday of National Foundation Day, which he had helped create two years previously through lobbying effects of a right-wing organization which he led.

From May 1929, Nagata became president of Takushoku University. Nagata returned as mayor of Tokyo again from May 30, 1930, to January 25, 1933. He was a strong supporter for the hosting of the 1940 Summer Olympics in Tokyo. For Nagata, it was essential that Tokyo host the 1940 Olympics, as the date coincided with the Japanese 2600th Anniversary celebrations. He was forced to resign after a police sweep rounded up 6900 suspected communists in Tokyo.

Nagata subsequently served in the House of Peers in the Diet of Japan. From March 9, 1936 to February 2, 1937, Nagata was appointed Minister of Colonial Affairs under the Kōki administration. He returned to the cabinet as Railway Minister under the Abe administration from November 29, 1939, to January 14, 1940.

Nagata was also one of the founders of the Japan Football Association.

References 

|-

|-

|-

|-

|-

|-

1876 births
1943 deaths
Politicians from Hyōgo Prefecture
Members of the House of Peers (Japan)
Government ministers of Japan
Mayors of Tokyo